Mykyta Bohdanovych Khodakovskyi (born 18 October 1996) is a Ukrainian professional footballer who plays as a atacking midfielder.

Career
Born in Dnipropetrovsk, Khodakovskyi is a product of different sportive schools in his native city.

He spent his career with different Ukrainian teams, including Ukrainian Premier League sides and made his debut in the league playing for Zirka Kropyvnytskyi as a second half-time substituted player in the losing away match against Oleksandriya on 6 May 2018.

References

External links
 
 
 

1996 births
Living people
Ukrainian footballers
Footballers from Dnipro
Association football midfielders
FC Oleksandriya players
FC Stal Kamianske players
FC Zirka Kropyvnytskyi players
FC Hirnyk-Sport Horishni Plavni players
FC Bukovyna Chernivtsi players
FC Lviv players
FC Krystal Kherson players
FC Olimpik Donetsk players
Ukrainian Premier League players
Ukrainian First League players
Ukrainian Second League players